The Aiguilles d'Entrèves is a mountain peak in the Mont Blanc massif of the Alps. It is situated at the head of the Glacier du Géant, and its rocky summit ridge forms part of the frontier between France and Italy. It lies east of the Tour Ronde, between the Col d'Entrèves and the Col Occidental de Toule. It has a steep, sound face of red granite and can be readily accessed from the Torino Hut/Pointe Helbronner.

Climbing
The Aiguilles d'Entrèves was first climbed on 31 August 1897, by Adolfo Hess, Flavio Santi and Julien Proment.

The easiest means of ascent is via the mountain's NE ridge from Col du Toule. 

An ascent via the SW ridge from the Col d'Entreves, followed by a traverse of its rocky, pinnacled crest and a descent via the easy NE ridge is a popular outing for many climbers. Grade: AD- (IV 4c)

Other routes: W face  Grade IV/V 4hr from Torino hut.

References

External links
 Aiguilles d'Entrèves on French IGN mapping portal
Traverse of Aiguilles (video, in French)

Mountains of the Alps
Mont Blanc massif